Mahua Moitra (born 12 October 1974) is an Indian politician and a Member of parliament in the 17th Lok Sabha from Krishnanagar, Nadia District, West Bengal. She contested and won the seat in the 2019 Indian general election as an All India Trinamool Congress (AITC) party candidate.

Moitra served as a member of the West Bengal Legislative Assembly representing Karimpur from 2016 to 2019, and has served as the general secretary and national spokesperson of the AITC for the past few years. She was an investment banker before entering politics.

Early life 
Moitra was born to Dwipendra Lal Moitra and Manjoo Moitra on 12 October 1974 in Labac in the Cachar district of Barak Valley. She hails from a Bengali Hindu Brahmin family and has a sister.
 

Moitra went to school in Kolkata. She graduated in economics and mathematics in 1998 from Mount Holyoke College South Hadley in Massachusetts, United States.

Moitra worked as an investment banker for JPMorgan Chase in New York City and London.

Political career
She quit her position as vice-president at JPMorgan Chase in London in 2009 to enter Indian politics. Subsequently, she joined the Indian Youth Congress, the youth wing of the Indian National Congress party where she was one of the trusted hands of Rahul Gandhi in the project "Aam Admi Ka Sipahi". In 2010, she moved to the All India Trinamool Congress party. She was elected from the Karimpur constituency in Nadia district, West Bengal in the Legislative Assembly elections held in 2016. She has been elected as a member of parliament to the 17th Lok Sabha from Krishnanagar, West Bengal.

On 13 November 2021, she was appointed TMC party's Goa in-charge to prepare the party for contesting the 2022 Goa Legislative Assembly election.

Lawsuits
On 10 January 2017, Moitra filed a police complaint against Bharatiya Janata Party MP and Union Minister Babul Supriyo for allegedly "insulting her modesty" during a national television debate. The complaint was later dismissed by the Calcutta High Court. A few days later, Babul Supriyo sent legal notices to Moitra and TMC MPs Saugata Roy and Tapas Paul for allegedly defaming him by accusing him of being involved in the Rose Valley ponzi firm scam.

In January 2020, Zee media filed a defamatory lawsuit against Moitra for apparently making derogatory statements against the channel while addressing reporters. She was granted bail and put on trial by a Delhi Court. She later won the case and the charges against her were dismissed.

Opinions

Political Issues 
On 26 June 2019, Moitra pointed out seven early signs of fascism, which she claims are present in India under Narendra Modi's government. She said that constitution on which every MP has sworn to protect is now under threat. In December 2020, she called the press as "2 paisa" after which the local news media criticised her heavily and decided to boycott her. Her party distanced themselves from her comments.

Criticising the judiciary and the current government in the parliament on 8 February 2021, Moitra stated "The sacred cow that was the judiciary is no longer sacred, It stopped being sacred the day a sitting chief justice of this country was accused of sexual harassment, presided over his own trial, cleared himself and then proceeded to accept the nomination to the upper house within three months of retirement, replete with Z+ security cover". The speech caused an uproar in the house with member of the ruling party calling it 'objectionable' and violating parliamentary rules because it mentioned a person in "high authority". Opposition members supported the speech as it was based on facts which are matters of public record. 

The remarks were finally expunged from the records. On 11 February 2021, BJP leaders Nishikant Dubey and PP Chowdhary moved a privilege notice against Moitra.

On 7 April 2022, Mahua Moitra argued in the parliament that the Criminal Procedure (Identification) Bill, 2022 is even more intrusive than colonial surveillance laws in India.

Social Issues 
She condemned the acquittal and thereafter, garlanding of rapists of Bilkis Bano by local BJP politicians and VHP workers by calling out their Islamophobia and hate for women and said that for every BJP Politician who lauds this as sanskari, there exists a Kali (Hindu Goddess) who will fight back.

'Kaali' controversy 
On 5 July 2022 at the India Today Conclave East, while reacting to a film poster showing goddess Kali smoking a cigarette, Moitra said, “Kaali to me is a meat-eating, alcohol-accepting goddess. You have the freedom to imagine your goddess. There are some places where whiskey is offered to gods and in some other places it would be blasphemy.” Distancing itself from the controversy, her party All India Trinamool Congress issued a statement — “Her views expressed on Goddess Kali have been made in her personal capacity and are not endorsed by the party in any manner or form”, condemning Moitra's remarks. Subsequently, police complaints were filed against Moitra by the Bengal BJP in Kolkata and five districts of West Bengal, as well as in Bhopal, Madhya Pradesh.

Personal life
Moitra was married to Danish financier Lars Brorson, with whom she later divorced.

References

External links 
 Lok Sabha Member Profile
 West Bengal Legislative Assembly

 

 

1974 births
Living people
People from Cachar district
Politicians from Kolkata
West Bengal politicians
Trinamool Congress politicians from West Bengal
Mount Holyoke College alumni
JPMorgan Chase employees
Indian expatriates in the United States
Indian investment bankers
West Bengal MLAs 2016–2021
Women in West Bengal politics
Women members of the West Bengal Legislative Assembly
India MPs 2019–present
Lok Sabha members from West Bengal
Women members of the Lok Sabha
Women in Goa politics
21st-century Indian politicians
21st-century Indian women politicians